Saint Mary's Cathedral, better known as Lugo Cathedral, is a Roman Catholic church and basilica in Lugo, Galicia, north-western Spain. The cathedral was erected in the early 12th century in a Romanesque style, with Gothic, Baroque and Neoclassicist elements.

History
A church existed in the site from 755. In 1129 Bishop Peter III commissioned a new edifice in the latest architectural style from Raimundo, a local architect and builder. This Romanesque structure was completed in 1273.

Later renovations and restorations added elements in other styles, such as the Renaissance retablo at the high altar. It was destroyed in the 1755 Lisbon earthquake and fragments of it are housed in the church.

The cathedral received from the Pope the privilege to permanently expose the Holy Sacrament.

Structure
The cathedral has a Latin Cross structure, with a length of 85 m. It has a nave, covered by a barrel vault, and two aisles, with an ambulatory and five apse chapels. The triforium features triple ogival mullioned windows. The apse houses a calvary sculpture from an unknown date.

The façade is a Renaissance design by  inspired by a plan proposed by Ventura Rodríguez for the Cathedral of Pamplona. Its construction was finished in the late 19th century, with the completion of the two side towers.

The northern entrance's narthex is in Gothic style, dating to 1510-1530. Internally showing a starred vault, it is formed by three archivolts with a lintel showing Christ Pantocrator and with a pinjante (glove-shaped decorative pendant) that features a depiction of the Last Supper.

To the right of the entrance is the Gothic Torre Vella (bell tower), surmounted by a Renaissance top floor finished by Gaspar de Arce in 1580. The sacristy  (1678) and the cloister (1714) are in the Baroque style, as is the central chapel of the triforium (1726). The chapel of St. Froilán is in Renaissance style, dating to the 17th century. Notable is the choir, built by Francisco de Moure (early 17th century).

References

13th-century Roman Catholic church buildings in Spain
Lugo
Lugo
Basilica churches in Spain
Renaissance architecture in Galicia (Spain)
Romanesque architecture in Galicia (Spain)
Baroque architecture in Galicia (Spain)
Buildings and structures in the Province of Lugo
Bien de Interés Cultural landmarks in the Province of Lugo
Churches completed in 1273